General elections were held in Senegal on 28 January 1973 to elect a President and National Assembly. At the time the country was a one-party state, with the Senegalese Progressive Union (UPS) as the sole legal party, As a result, its leader, Léopold Sédar Senghor, was the only candidate in the presidential election and was re-elected unopposed. In the National Assembly election, voters were presented with a list of 100 UPS candidates (for the 100 seats) to vote for. Voter turnout was 93.0% in the parliamentary elections and 97% in the presidential election.

Results

President

National Assembly

References

Senegal
Elections in Senegal
1973 in Senegal
One-party elections
Single-candidate elections
Presidential elections in Senegal